Unstoppable: Conversation with Melvin Van Peebles, Gordon Parks, and Ossie Davis is a film in which Melvin Van Peebles, Gordon Parks, and Ossie Davis are interviewed together, with moderation by Warrington Hudlin. It was first shown on the STARZ network, and has not been released on DVD. It also features Ruby Dee  and Nelson George.

References

External links
 

2005 television films
2005 films